Klostergasthof Andechs is a monastery restaurant in Andechs Abbey, Bavaria, Germany founded in 1438.

In the middle of 15th century, Duke Albrecht III donated this „most worthy of inns“ to the newly founded Benedictine abbey at Andechs. Klostergasthof tavern was renovated in 1992 and 3 rooms were added during refurbishment.

See also 
List of oldest companies

References

External links 
Homepage in German

Restaurants in Germany
Companies established in the 15th century
15th-century establishments in the Holy Roman Empire
Restaurants established in the 15th century